The 1906–07 Harvard Crimson men's ice hockey season was the tenth season of play for the program.

Season
Harvard's unbeaten streak was finally ended in 1907. The Crimson ice hockey team lost twice during the season, suffering their first defeat since March 15, 1902. The loss to Princeton also ended Harvard's four-year reign as Intercollegiate Hockey Association champion as the Tigers were able to finish undefeated in league play.

Roster

Standings

Schedule and Results

|-
!colspan=12 style=";" | Regular Season

Scoring Statistics

Note: Assists were not recorded as a statistic.

References

Harvard Crimson men's ice hockey seasons
Harvard
Harvard
Harvard
Harvard
Harvard